Smoline is an urban-type settlement located in Novoukrainka Raion, Kirovohrad Oblast, Ukraine. It hosts the administration of Smoline settlement hromada, one of the hromadas of Ukraine. Population: 

Until 18 July 2020, Smoline belonged to Mala Vyska Raion. The raion was abolished in July 2020 as part of the administrative reform of Ukraine, which reduced the number of raions of Kirovohrad Oblast to four. The area of Mala Vyska Raion was merged into Novoukrainka Raion.

Population 

Sources: 1979–1989;
2001–2014

References 

Urban-type settlements in Novoukrainka Raion